Gellers is a Japanese rock band formed in Tokyo, taking influences from The Clash, Pavement and the Sex Pistols.

History
Gellers is a band that consists of childhood friends.

They performed live at Fuji Rock Festival in 2007 and 2010.

Members
 – vocals, guitar
 – vocals, synthesizer, Percussion
 – vocals, guitar
 – bass guitar, Recording Engineer
 – drums

Discography

Album 
 GELLERS(2007)

Single 
 Guatemala(2011)

External links
 Official Website
  Gellers My Space
 Label Compare Notes Records(map)

Japanese alternative rock groups
Japanese indie rock groups
Japanese punk rock groups
Musical groups from Tokyo